Lord Bentinck may refer to:

 Lord George Bentinck (1802–1848), English Conservative politician and racehorse owner
 Lord William Bentinck (1774–1839), British soldier and statesman

See also

 Lord Charles Bentinck (1780–1826), British soldier and politician